Stade Pierre de Coubertin is a multi-purpose stadium in Cannes, France. The stadium was opened in 1937. It is used mostly for football matches and is the home stadium of AS Cannes. The stadium is able to hold 10,000 people.

References

Pierre de Coubertin
Buildings and structures in Cannes
Sports venues in Alpes-Maritimes